Volvarina hyalina is a species of sea snail, a marine gastropod mollusk in the family Marginellidae, the margin snails.

Description
The shell size varies between 4.5 mm and 8 mm

Distribution
This species is found in the cold waters along the South Shetlands and in the Weddell Sea, Antarctica.

References

 Cossignani T. (2006). Marginellidae & Cystiscidae of the World. L'Informatore Piceno. 408pp
 Engl, W. (2012). Shells of Antarctica. Hackenheim: Conchbooks. 402 pp.

Marginellidae
Gastropods described in 1913